Mikko Husu (30 September 1905 – 13 June 1977) was a Finnish cross-country skier who competed in the 1930s. He won a gold medal in the 4 × 10 km relay at the 1935 FIS Nordic World Ski Championships in Vysoké Tatry.

Husu would also finish fourth in the 50 km event at those same championships.

Cross-country skiing results
All results are sourced from the International Ski Federation (FIS).

World Championships
 1 medal – (1 gold)

References

External links

Finnish male cross-country skiers
1905 births
1977 deaths
FIS Nordic World Ski Championships medalists in cross-country skiing
20th-century Finnish people